GRV may refer to:

 Gaussian random variable, a variable in normal distribution in statistics
 Gawler Range Volcanics, a geological event in South Australia
 Gravesend railway station, England
 Greenville station (South Carolina), a train station
 Greyhound Racing Victoria
 Gross rock volume, a calculation used in hydrocarbon exploration
 Groundnut rosette virus, a plant pathogen
 Grozny Airport, in Chechnya, Russia
 GRV, the ISO code of the Central Grebo language